Sergeant Joseph Harcourt Tombs VC (23 March 1887 − 28 June 1966), born Frederick Griffith Tombs, who under the name Joseph Tombs, was an English recipient of the Victoria Cross (VC), the highest award of the British (Imperial) honours system. The VC is awarded for ‘most conspicuous bravery … in the presence of the enemy’.

VC action
Tombs was born in Birmingham and was a 28-year-old Lance-Corporal in the 1st Battalion, The King's (Liverpool Regiment), British Army during the First World War when the following deed took place for which he was awarded the VC.
On 16 May 1915 near Rue du Bois, France, Lance-Corporal Tombs, on his own initiative, crawled out repeatedly under very heavy shell and machine-gun fire to bring in wounded men who were lying about 100 yards in front of our trenches. He rescued four men, one of whom he dragged back by means of a rifle sling placed round his own neck and the man's body.

Later life
He was promoted Corporal in the field (24 May 1915) and after the war, emigrated to Canada where he spent the rest of his life. On 25 May 1920, Tombs enlisted in the Canadian Army in Montréal, and served as a Private in The Royal Canadian Regiment.  His attestation papers are held in The Royal Canadian Regiment Museum, Wolseley Barracks, London, Ontario). During the Second World War Tombs enlisted in the Royal Canadian Air Force and served at the Flying School in Trenton, Ontario, Canada.   A 1952 operation to remove some of the shrapnel still embedded in his stomach was not completely successful, and in 1964 he suffered a stroke.
His Victoria Cross is held by the Royal Regiment of Canada Foundation, Toronto, Ontario, Canada.

Notes

References
VCs of the First World War - The Western Front 1915 (Peter F. Batchelor & Christopher Matson, 1999)
 Victoria Cross and the George Cross: the complete history (Methuen, 2013)
 Valiant Men: Canada's Victoria Cross and George Cross winners (edited by John Swettenham, 1973)

External links
http://www.victoriacross.org.uk/bbtombsj.htm

1880s births
1966 deaths
Royal Canadian Regiment soldiers
Burials in Ontario
British World War I recipients of the Victoria Cross
King's Regiment (Liverpool) soldiers
Canadian military personnel of World War II
Military personnel from Birmingham, West Midlands
British Army personnel of World War I
British emigrants to Canada
Recipients of the Cross of St. George
British Army recipients of the Victoria Cross
Tombs family